Simone Bentivoglio (born 29 May 1985) is an Italian footballer. He plays as a midfielder for Vigasio.

Club career
He started his professional career at Juventus F.C., giant of Turin. After he spent on loan at Mantova os Serie B, A.C. ChievoVerona bought him in co-ownership deal, for €220,000, but loaned him again to Modena of Serie B, along with Tommaso Chiecchi.

In June 2007, Chievo had to rebuild the team due to relegation, Bentivoglio was signed permanently for €500,000.

Bentivoglio moved to Serie B club Sampdoria on 24 August 2011 for a season-long loan deal. On 26 January 2012 is transferred to Padova.

After missing the entire 2012–2013 season for the disqualification due to match-fixing, in the summer of 2013 is restored to Chievo Verona pink. After the loan at Brescia in the 2014–2015 season, on 1 July 2015 returns to Chievo Verona on 28 August but rescinds his contract by mutual agreement thus remaining free transfer; three days later he was hired by Modena. The 8 July 2016 is presented as a new purchase of Venezia.

On 23 July 2019, he signed with Siena. On 10 January 2020, he extended his contract with Siena until June 2021 and was loaned to Virtus Verona for the rest of the 2019–20 season.

On 6 August 2021, he joined SSD Vigasio, which plays on the amateur levels.

International career
Bentivoglio played with the Italy under-20 side in the 2005 FIFA World Youth Championship.
He made his Italy U-21 team debut against Luxembourg U-21, 12 December 2006, as starter.

References

External links
FIGC 
 Profile at La Gazzetta

1985 births
Living people
People from Pinerolo
Footballers from Piedmont
Italian footballers
Juventus F.C. players
Mantova 1911 players
Modena F.C. players
A.C. ChievoVerona players
S.S.C. Bari players
U.C. Sampdoria players
Calcio Padova players
Brescia Calcio players
Venezia F.C. players
A.C.N. Siena 1904 players
Serie A players
Serie B players
Serie C players
Association football midfielders
Italy youth international footballers
Italy under-21 international footballers
Sportspeople from the Metropolitan City of Turin